The Dande is a river in northern Angola with a source in the Crystal Mountains. Its mouth is at the Atlantic Ocean at Barra do Dande in Bengo Province. It also flows through the city of Caxito, and Uige Province. The lower section of the river is a floodplain with several small lakes including Lakes Sungue, Ibendua and Morima. 

The 18MW Mabubas Dam on the Dande is a significant power source in Northern Angola.

See also
List of rivers of Angola
Energy in Angola

References

Rivers of Angola